The Alberta School for the Deaf is a provincial school in Edmonton, Alberta with elementary and secondary residential and day programs serving deaf and hard-of-hearing students.

Teachers are both deaf and hearing. Alberta School for the Deaf is modeled on a bilingual-bicultural approach. The total enrollment, including the elementary school, is 100 as of 2020–21. Students from across Alberta and the Northwest Territories attend the school.

Deaf students from Canada often attend Gallaudet University in Washington D.C. for post-secondary programs.

References

Schools for the deaf in Canada
High schools in Edmonton
Middle schools in Edmonton
Elementary schools in Edmonton
Educational institutions established in 1956
1956 establishments in Alberta
Boarding schools in Alberta